Yuxarı Yeməzli (also, Yukhari Yemazlu and Yukhary Yemezli) is a village in the Zangilan Rayon of Azerbaijan.

References 

Populated places in Zangilan District